Bettona (Latin: Vettona) is an ancient town and comune of Italy, in the province of Perugia in central Umbria at the northern edge of the Colli Martani range. It is 5 km (3 mi) E of Torgiano and 12 km (7 mi) SW of Assisi.

Passaggio, Colle and Cerreto are frazioni of the comune.

History

The town is of Etruscan origin; its people are first referred to in Pliny, NH III.114 (Vettonenses), then in other ancient authors and inscriptions. 

Vettona was once the seat of a bishopric. While legend associates two other bishops with the see, the only historically documented one is Gaudentius, who took part in a synod at Rome called by Pope Hilarius in 465.

Under the Latin name Bettonium the bishopric is listed by the Catholic Church as a titular see.

Main sights
Bettona still retains a complete circuit of medieval walls incorporating portions of the original Etruscan walls. The town was sacked in 1352 and very little remains save the churches that have since been completely updated. The town was ordered rebuilt by Cardinal Albornoz who built a small rocca where the Church of San Crispolto stands. The remains of a draw bridge can be found in a piazza now used for parking near the town's rear gate, Porta Romana. 

The Pinacoteca Comunale in the Palazzetto del Podestà (1371) has a painting by Perugino, the Madonna of Mercy, as well as other works by Jacopo Siculo, Dono Doni, Fiorenzo di Lorenzo and Della Robbia.

Santa Maria Maggiore church, situated in the historical centre, is the main church of the Comune. A Gothic chapel located near the nave entrance and dedicated to Saint Rita, is the only remaining part of the original church. The main altar is in the shape of domed temple, by Cruciano Egiduzio. The apse was frescoed in 1939 by the futurist painter Gerardo Dottori.

The church of San Crispolto was erected by monks to preserve the body of the patron saint (8th century). The current façade is by Antonio Stefanucci.

In the “Oratorio of St. Andrea” is a series of paintings from the school of Giotto, dated 1394, which show the Passion of Christ rediscovered during a 1980s restoration. There is also a beautiful carved wooden ceiling and baroque altar.

References

External links

 Bettona official site, also in English
• http://www.prolocobettona.it/ For information on events in Bettona, visit the site of our Proloco

Hilltowns in Umbria